Lidia Menapace (born Brisca, 3 April 1924 – 7 December 2020) was an Italian resistance fighter and politician who served in the Senate from 2006 to 2008, representing the Communist Refoundation Party.

Biography
Lidia Menapace née Brisca was born in the northern Italian city of Novara. Her father was a surveyor named Giacomo Brisca and espoused antifascist politics. Her mother was Italia Vercesi, a homemaker whose family tended towards anarchy.

While Lidia was in primary school, during the dictatorship of Mussolini, her teachers taught the children to honor and love the regime. But Lidia's mother told her to destroy school reports in which she was classified as belonging to the "Aryan race" because "We are not animals."  In 1943 her father was sent to a concentration camp because he would not obey the authority of the Republic of Salò, a recently created Nazi puppet state in northern Italy. Two years later he was freed, and in the meantime his daughter, Lidia, had joined the resistance at age 19.

During the time she was a literature student at the Catholic University of Milan, she delivered messages to antifascist soldiers. She also helped Jewish men to escape Italy by bringing them to the Swiss border, and she helped organize escapes from prison. She hid bombs and copies of a Resistance newspaper in the basement of her family's home. She also passed secret messages to political prisoners in jail.

After her role in the WWII resistance, during which she rode her bicycle to deliver encoded messages to Italian resistance fighters, Menapace became a pacifism activist and women's rights advocate. She was a member of the collective that founded Il Manifesto, a left-wing newspaper.  She was the first woman elected to a legislature position in Bolzano.

Menapace was married to Eugenio Menapace. She died from COVID-19 on 7 December 2020, during the COVID-19 pandemic in Italy.

References

External links 
 Files about her parliamentary activities (in Italian): XV

1924 births
2020 deaths
Italian partisans
People from Novara
Università Cattolica del Sacro Cuore alumni
Communist Refoundation Party politicians
Senators of Legislature XV of Italy
Deaths from the COVID-19 pandemic in Trentino-Alto Adige/Südtirol
20th-century Italian women politicians
21st-century Italian women politicians
Italian resistance movement members
Women members of the Senate of the Republic (Italy)